The National Bioethics Advisory Commission was the name of a United States governmental organization which existed from 1996–2001. It was replaced by The President's Council on Bioethics.

Reports
In 1999 the NBAC issued a report containing 23 recommendations on the governance of biobanks. Other work during its existence was the creation of 120 recommendations  on bioethics issues human cloning, research involving mental vulnerable persons, research with human biological specimens, stem cell research, clinical trials in developing countries but sponsored by the United States, and privacy for research participants.

Here are the titles of the reports published by the commission:
 Ethical and Policy Issues in Research Involving Human Participants
 Ethical and Policy Issues in International Research: Clinical Trials in Developing Countries
 Ethical Issues in Human Stem Cell Research
 Research Involving Human Biological Materials: Ethical Issues and Policy Guidance
 Research Involving Persons with Mental Disorders That May Affect Decisionmaking Capacity
 Cloning Human Beings

References

External links
 archived site

Bioethics research organizations
Biobank organizations
Government agencies of the United States
1996 establishments in the United States
2001 disestablishments in the United States